Guitar Dominance! is the first studio album by guitarist Joe Stump, released in 1993 through Leviathan Records; a remastered edition was reissued in 2003.

Critical reception

Robert Taylor at AllMusic gave Guitar Dominance! 1.5 stars out of 5, calling it "a rather mediocre debut" and that it "sounds like something from the '80s rather than the '90s." Regarding Stump's guitar work, he said "What Stump lacks in originality he makes up for in technique, but his blatant purloining of Yngwie Malmsteen's style and licks is embarrassing and unnecessary." The album's production values were also criticized as lackluster.

Track listing

Personnel
Joe Stump – guitar, arrangement
Darrell Maxfield – drums
John Risti – bass
Ducky Carlisle – engineering, mixing
David Shew – remastering

References

External links
Joe Stump "Guitar Dominance" at Guitar Nine Records (archived)

Joe Stump albums
1993 debut albums